Robert Mansfield Rucker (born Chicago, Illinois, raised in Miami, Florida) is a jazz drummer, music teacher, and composer.

Rucker has recorded and performed with Grammy award winning artists  Wynton Marsalis, John Daversa, Scotty Barnhart and Ted Nash Robert has also shared the stage with notable musicians such as Marcus Roberts, Wessell (Warm Daddy) Anderson, Wycliffe Gordon, Philip Harper, Eric Lewis, Stephon Harris,and Sam and Dave.  He has also produced music for Sony Pictures along side Stephen Marley and Dead Prez, What Are You Waiting For: NYU Stern School of Business  and performs with a jazz band called The Robert Rucker Project.  

Robert is endorsed by Bosphorus and SoulTone Cymbals and Canopus Drums

Early life
After graduating from Miami Douglas MacArthur North, Robert attended Florida A&M University in Tallahassee, Florida. He was a member of the notable "The Marching 100" Marching Band and Jazz Ensemble. Robert later moved to Jacksonville, Florida and transferred to the University of North Florida where he received his B.A in Music. In 1995, Robert moved New York to attend graduate School at Manhattan School of Music. After graduation, Robert began to teach music in New York and New Jersey Public Schools.

Music career
Robert appears on Wynton Marsalis "Amongst the People: Live at the House of Tribes on Blue Note Records. He also is featured on the soundtrack of the Movie "Black or White with hip-hop duo "Dead Prez". Robert released and produced his debut Cd "Make Blue" featuring Philip Harper and Todd Williams.  In 2002, his latest release "Blue York" featured the world-renowned trumpeter Wynton Marsalis.

Discography

As leader
 1998: Make Blue
 2002: Blue York

As sideman
 2000: Movie Soundtrack "Black & White"Dem Crazy
 2005: Amongst the People "Live at the House of Tribes(Blue Note Records)
 2022: Introducing Quartet Trio "Live at Smalls Jazz Club

References

Living people
American jazz drummers
American educators
1967 births
20th-century American drummers
American male drummers
20th-century American male musicians
American male jazz musicians
